Eina is a former municipality in the old Oppland county, Norway. The  municipality existed from 1908 until its dissolution in 1964. The area is now part of Vestre Toten Municipality in the traditional district of Toten. The administrative centre was the village of Eina.

History
The municipality of Eina was established on 1 January 1908 when the old Vestre Toten Municipality was divided in three. The southwestern part (population: 1,173) became Eina Municipality, the southeastern part (population: 2,412) became Kolbu Municipality, and the northern part (population: 4,027) continued as Vestre Toten Municipality. During the 1960s, there were many municipal mergers across Norway due to the work of the Schei Committee. On 1 January 1964, Eina Municipality (population: 1,591) was merged with Vestre Toten Municipality (population: 9,113) plus the Sørligrenda area of Vardal Municipality (population: 87) and the small area on the south end of the lake Einavatnet (population: 12) from Gran Municipality to form the new Vestre Toten Municipality.

Name
The municipality (originally the parish) was named after the lake Einavatnet. The old name for the lake comes from the Old Norse word einir which means juniper, likely referring to the vegetation around the lake.

Government
All municipalities in Norway, including Eina, are responsible for primary education (through 10th grade), outpatient health services, senior citizen services, unemployment and other social services, zoning, economic development, and municipal roads. The municipality was governed by a municipal council of elected representatives, which in turn elected a mayor.

Municipal council
The municipal council  of Eina was made up of 13 representatives that were elected to four year terms.  The party breakdown of the final municipal council was as follows:

Mayor
The mayors of Eina:

1908–1910: Mathias Larsen Blilie (V)
1911–1922: Thorvald Andreassen Skaug (LL)
1923–1945: Thorvald P. Amlien (Bp)
1945-1945: Asbjørn Skaug (V)
1946–1948: Ingvald Nyhus (KrF)
1949–1951: Aksel Skaug (Bp)
1952–1955: Paul Hoelsveen (Bp)
1956–1959: Magne Bjørnerud (Bp)
1960–1963: Paul Hoelsveen (Sp)

See also
List of former municipalities of Norway

References

Vestre Toten
Former municipalities of Norway
1908 establishments in Norway
1964 disestablishments in Norway